Blaine Bennett (born c. 1964) is a former American football player and coach. He is the head football coach at Post Falls High School in Post Falls, Idaho, a position he has held since 2016. Bennett served as the head football coach at Western Oregon University from 1995 to 2000 and at Central Washington University from 2008 to 2012, compiling a career college football coaching record of 68–48.

Head coaching record

College

References

Year of birth missing (living people)
1960s births
Living people
American football quarterbacks
Central Washington Wildcats football coaches
Idaho Vandals football players
Michigan State Spartans football coaches
Purdue Boilermakers football coaches
Western Oregon Wolves football coaches
Whitworth Pirates football players
High school football coaches in Idaho
Washington State University alumni
People from Ellensburg, Washington
Sportspeople from Walla Walla, Washington
Players of American football from Washington (state)